Scout's Honor is a 1980 American made-for-television comedy-drama film starring Gary Coleman, 
Katherine Helmond, Wilfrid Hyde-White, Pat O'Brien and Harry Morgan. It was broadcast September 30, 1980 on NBC.

Director Henry Levin died after suffering a heart attack while on location on May 1, 1980.

Plot
Gary Coleman stars as little Joey Seymour, a clever but lonely orphan shuffled from one foster home to the next, who is also determined to be the best Cub Scout ever. Pearl Bartlett (Katherine Helmond) is a hard-working executive who dislikes children, but she must take on a troop of Cub Scouts and become a den mother to save her job.

On an outing, she takes her den to a nearby park where the boys discover a cave and decide to explore. By accident, they cause a "cave-in" and the excitement begins. But little Joey saves the day, and in the process, teaches Pearl the true meaning of caring. Pearl returns the favour as she offers Joey the best gift a deserving orphan could get: she officially adopts him.

Cast

 Gary Coleman as Joey Seymour
 Katherine Helmond as Pearl Bartlett
 Wilfrid Hyde-White as Uncle Toby 'Nuncle' Bartlett
 Pat O'Brien as Mr. Caboose
 Harry Morgan as Mr. Briggs
 Eric Taslitz as Grogan
 Meeno Peluce as Big Ace
 Marcello Krakoff as Little Ace
 John Louie as Patrick
 Angela Cartwright as Alfredo's Mom
 Lauren Chapin as Ace's Mom
 Jay North as Grogan's Dad
 Paul Petersen as Ace's Dad
 Joanna Moore as Ms. Odom
 Peter Hobbs as U.S. President
 Wesley Pfenning as Ms. Lopes (as Wesley Ann Pfenning)
 Robert Trujillo as Boy Scout
 Basil Hoffman as Alexander
 Rance Howard as Captain
 Al Fann as Mr. Prewitt
 Shelley Oloport as Linda
 Bobby Lento as Football Player
 Shavar Ross as Joey's Schoolmate

References

External links
 

1980 television films
1980 films
1980 comedy-drama films
American comedy-drama television films
NBC network original films
Films about orphans
Films directed by Henry Levin
1980s English-language films
1980s American films